Amanda H. Lynch is an environmental and social scientist, and the Director of the Brown Institute of Environment and Society and Sloan Lindemann and George Lindemann Jr. Distinguished Professor of Environmental Studies at Brown University. She is a Fellow of the American Meteorological Society and Australian Academy of Technological Sciences and Engineering.

Career
After earning her Ph.D. in Atmospheric Sciences from the University of Melbourne in 1993, Lynch developed the first Arctic regional climate system model. In 2003, while working at the University of Colorado, Lynch was granted a Federation Fellowship by the Australian Research Council.

After working at Monash University, she joined Brown University in 2011 as a professor of Earth, environmental, and planetary sciences. While at the University in 2013, Lynch was named a chief editor of the Weather, Climate and Society journal and was named a Fellow of the American Meteorological Society. In 2017, Lynch was elected by a unanimous vote to join the Norwegian Scientific Academy for Polar Research. She also works on the United Nations World Meteorological Organization as co-chair of the World Climate Research Programme and sits as a board members on the Policy Sciences journal.

Personal life
Lynch has two children.

References

Living people
Year of birth missing (living people)
Brown University faculty
Academic staff of Monash University
University of Melbourne alumni
Australian women academics
Fellows of the American Meteorological Society
Fellows of the Australian Academy of Technological Sciences and Engineering
Australian women scientists